Vantage point may refer to:

Vantage Point, the former Archway Tower, an apartment building in north London
 Vantage Point (film), a 2008 thriller film
 Vantage Point (album), a 2008 rock album by dEUS
 The Vantage Point, a magazine
 Vantage Point: Developments in North Korea, a South Korean magazine
 The Vantage Point: Perspectives of the Presidency, 1963-1969, the memoirs of Lyndon B. Johnson
 A position or place that affords a wide or advantageous perspective:
 Overlook, a high place where people can gather to view scenery
 Camera angle in photography, filmmaking, and other visual arts
 Perspective (graphical)

See also
 Perspective (disambiguation)
 Point of view (disambiguation)
 View (disambiguation)
 Viewpoint (disambiguation)